Aloe viridiflora is a species of plant in the genus Aloe. The species is endemic to Namibia with a wide range (the extent of occurrence is greater than 20,000 km2) and is known from at least six different populations. Current trends are not known and the species is listed as LC (least concern) on the IUCN Red List. However, it is scarce and Namibian authorities consider it threatened; the plant must not be removed or disturbed. It is the only known green-flowering aloe. Its natural habitats are dry savanna, subtropical or tropical dry shrubland, and rocky areas. It can produce hallucinations when ingested, leading to its occasional use in shamanic rituals.

Description
Aloe viridiflora grows in individually, in dense stemless rosettes of 50 to 60 lanceolate narrowed leaves. The glaucous, clearly lined leaf blade grows up to 100 mm long and 20 mm wide. The pungent, pink reddish brown teeth on the leaf margin are 2 mm long and are 2 to 5 mm apart.

The inflorescence has up to six branches and reaches a length of about 150 cm. The dense, racemes are 250 mm long and 200 mm wide. They consist of approximately 50 to 60 individual flowers. The ovoid-pointed bracts have a length of 15 mm and are 7 mm wide. The club-shaped, green flowers are tinged with lemon yellow around the center and are held on 20 mm long pedicels. They are 33 mm long and narrowed at their base. Above the ovary, the flowers are expanded at the mouth to 10 mm. The tepals are not fused together. The stamens protrude 10 mm from the flower and the stylus 10 to 12 mm.

References

Bibliography 
 
 KykNET documentary. Kuier, Klets en Klits in Namibië. Aired on television on 12 January 2014.
 
 

viridiflora
Endemic flora of Namibia
Least concern plants
Least concern biota of Africa
Taxonomy articles created by Polbot